Café des Artistes is a restaurant in Puerto Vallarta, in the Mexican state of Jalisco.

Description
The restaurant serves French cuisine, operating only for dinner. Fodor's says, "Several sleek dining spaces make up the original, downtown restaurant Café des Artistes; the most beautiful and romantic is the courtyard garden with modern sculpture."

Reception
In his Moon guide of Puerto Vallarta, Justin Henderson said Café des Artistes is "considered by many to be the best restaurant in town".

See also

 List of French restaurants
 List of restaurants in Mexico

References

External links
 

French restaurants
Puerto Vallarta
Restaurants in Jalisco